Steven Scutt (born 1956), is a male former athlete who competed for England.  He won a gold medal for England in the 4x400m relay at the 1982 Commonwealth Games held in Brisbane, Queensland, Australia.  He was also a two time United Kingdom champion in the 400m race.

Athletics career
Scutt was a twice United Kingdom National champion after winning the 1979 UK Athletics Championships and the 1981 UK Athletics Championships over 400 metres. He ran for the Woodford Green Athletics Club.

He represented England and won a gold medal with Garry Cook, Phil Brown and Todd Bennett, in the 4x400m relay, at the 1982 Commonwealth Games in Brisbane, Queensland, Australia. He also competed in the 400 metres individual event where he progressed to the semi-finals.

Personal life
He was engaged to and then married fellow international athlete Michelle Scutt in 1980. In 2009, he was sentenced to 30 months in prison for fraud for misappropriating the money entrusted to him for developing and marketing an energy drink.

References

1956 births
English male sprinters
Athletes (track and field) at the 1982 Commonwealth Games
Commonwealth Games medallists in athletics
Commonwealth Games gold medallists for England
Living people
Medallists at the 1982 Commonwealth Games